Nova Marivka is a village in Telmanove Raion (district) in Donetsk Oblast of eastern Ukraine, at 85.9 km SSE from the centre of Donetsk city.

History
The settlement was taken under control of pro-Russian forces during the War in Donbas, that started in 2014.

Demographics

The settlement had 175 inhabitants in 2001; native language distribution as of the Ukrainian Census of 2001:
Ukrainian: 36.57%
Russian: 57.71%
Greek: 4.57%
German: 0.57%

References

Villages in Kalmiuske Raion